Mitrocomium is a genus of cnidarians belonging to the family Lovenellidae.

The species of this genus are found in Southern Hemisphere.

Species
Species:

Mitrocomium alcoicum 
Mitrocomium cirratum 
Mitrocomium medusiferum 
Mitrocomium simplex

References

Lovenellidae
Hydrozoan genera